David Rees James (7 October 1906 – c. 1981) was a Welsh rugby union, and professional rugby league footballer who played in the 1930s. He played representative level rugby union (RU) for Wales.

He died in Rhondda.

International honours
David James won caps for Wales (RU) while at Treorchy RFC in 1931 against France, and Ireland.

References

External links
Search for "James" at rugbyleagueproject.org

Statistics at scrum.com
Statistics at wru.co.uk

1906 births
1981 deaths
Footballers who switched code
Treorchy RFC players
Leeds Rhinos players
Rugby league hookers
Rugby league players from Rhondda Cynon Taf
Rugby union hookers
Rugby union players from Treorchy
Wales international rugby union players
Welsh rugby league players
Welsh rugby union players